Dilwale ( The big-hearted) is a 1994 Indian Hindi-language romantic action film starring Ajay Devgn, Sunil Shetty, Raveena Tandon and Paresh Rawal. Originally Divya Bharti signed for the lead, but due to her sudden demise, she was replaced by Tandon. It was released on 4 February 1994 and had a runtime of 180 minutes. Dilwale was declared a superhit at the box office and went on to become one of the highest grossing films of 1994. Suniel Shetty got nominated for the Filmfare Best Supporting Actor Award.

Plot
At a mental asylum, doctors discuss the strange case of Arun Saxena whose behaviour is very different from other patients. He tries to escape but is stopped just in nick of time by doctors. Arun's mother Jamuna sits in front of a temple everyday with her back turned to God, only vowing to face God when hope comes. Inspector Vikram Singh, a tough, young honest cop is assigned Arun's case. At first, he refuses but at a visit to Arun, he is touched by seeing his behaviour to his ex flame Sapna, because of whom he became mad. Vikram meets Jamuna to know Arun's story, and the film goes into past.

Arun was a happy free-spirited young poet who was always jovial in his life. Whilst attending a party, he sees and falls in love at first sight with Sapna, despite her not knowing this. Her evil uncle Rangeen "Mama" Thakur is holding a facade for last 20 years as his hidden motive is to usurp her wealth. Arun makes it clear to everyone how much he loves Sapna. He bashes up Shankar Bihari, a goon hired by Mama to marry Sapna, so that he can get her wealth. Sapna thinks Arun is a flirt, but later falls for him, seeing him almost commit suicide for her. Shankar sends Jyoti to Arun to go intimate with him. When Sapna sees this, she mistakes this as an affair. Arun clears the confusion; however Mama tries to attack and sends goons to kill him.

Arun and Jamuna are assaulted which sparks him into action, and he beats all goons. He pursues Sapna. Jyoti is falsely invited by Mama to click nude pictures at Arun's house and is murdered. Arun is framed for murder due to his acquaintance with her. Mama brutally tortures Jamuna when she comes in jail. Arun is forced to accept murder. Sapna starts hating him; Arun is unable to take this shock which drives him insane. One final attempt to kill Mama fails in the court; he's then taken to mental asylum.

Back to the present day, Vikram promises Jamuna that he will fight for Arun's justice. Vikram slowly becomes a thorn to Mama Thakur's illegal activities. Mama Thakur is in more trouble because Natwar had secretly clicked pictures of the murder and keeps blackmailing Mama, therefore Natwar is killed by contract killers. Arun, whilst running away from a mental hospital van, witness this. He reaches back to the mental hospital and draws evidence of the murderer in his hospital room wall. Vikram now realizes he has to catch Mama Thakur and starts to gather evidence against him. He also has to protect Arun by giving him accommodation at his home as his life is in danger. Mama Thakur tries to humiliate Vikram after he refuses to accept a bribe, but he and his brother are given a taste of their own medicine when they become smartasses to Vikram. Later, Vikram gets to know that the girl that he loved was actually Sapna, but she is Arun's now. Vikram has to reunite Arun with his love. He painfully makes Ram Singh tell the truth to Sapna as he was present when he and Arun's mum were tortured, but he was helpless due to Mama Thakur's fear, and Sapna is very resentful due to the mistake she gravely made.

Arun becomes better under Vikram's care. He almost gets killed by the men who killed Natwar after Vikram visited the mansion and told Mama Thakur his days were over. Arun gets an electric shock, however, that shock brings back all his memories and makes him sane again. Arun is now discharged from the hospital. Arun is sentenced to be hanged as soon as he is better but escapes to reunite with Sapna with Vikram's help. Arun then goes on a brutal vengeance mission and burns almost every godown (warehouse) of Mama Thakur, which angers the commissioner as he cannot persuade Arun to surrender. Arun then captures Mama Thakur from a police protection van and bashes him up badly. Vikram and Sapna arrive at the scene after Vikram rescues her from Shankar Bihari. All the goons are then killed. Arun's revenge is complete with Mama Thakur dead and Sapna back with him again.

Arun's mum and the commissioner arrive at the scene and tell Arun he is innocent as Advocate Sinha became the state witness, otherwise, he knows Arun would kill him for the role he played in getting Arun a death sentence. Arun forgives Sinha, and because he killed Mama Thakur, he has to go to jail. The commissioner promise Arun a short sentence in jail due to the physical and mental stress he has gone through. Vikram drives Arun and Sapna away in his van, secretly putting a brave smile on his face as he loved Sapna, as he sacrificed his own love for the happiness of Arun and Sapna, he justifies the name Dilwale.

Cast 
Suniel Shetty as Inspector Vikram Singh
Ajay Devgan as Arun Saxena
Raveena Tandon as Sapna Puri
Paresh Rawal as Mama Thakur
Gulshan Grover as Shankar Bihari
Pramod Moutho as Yashpal Thakur
Himani Shivpuri as Vandita Thakur
Reema Lagoo as Jamuna Saxena
Saeed Jaffrey as Police Commissioner Suryadhar Jaisingh
Navneet Nishan as Jyoti Bhatia
Tej Sapru as Inspector Rudranil Venkatraman
Javed Khan Amrohi as Constable Ram Singh
Avtaar Gill as Natwar Lal Yadav, Photographer .
Ajit Vachani as Public Prosecutor, Advocate Jagmohan Sinha
Vikas Anand as Judge Anupam Sharma
Rami Reddy as Banshul Singh
Achyut Potdar as Dr. Abhijeet Sonkar
Anang Desai as Dr. Rakvansh Deshpande
Virendra Saxena as Ward boy
Subbiraj as Former-Army Major Vidvaan Singh
Anil Dhawan as Vedaksh Singh
Sarala Yeolekar as Shraddha Singh
A. K. Hangal as Mental Hospital Patient 
Anjan Srivastav as Mental Hospital Patient 
Rajesh Puri as Mental Hospital Patient
Dinesh Kaushik as Mental Hospital Patient
Sameer Khakhar as Ward boy

Soundtrack

The music of the film was composed Nadeem-Shravan, and the lyrics were penned by Sameer Anjaan. The soundtrack was released in 1994 on Audio Cassette, LP & Audio Cds in Venus Records & Tapes Music, which consists of 7 songs. The album is recorded by Kumar Sanu, Alka Yagnik and Udit Narayan. The Soundtrack album sold 5.5 million units according to the figures of box office India making it one of the best selling Bollywood soundtracks of all time

References

External links
 

1994 films
Films scored by Nadeem–Shravan
1990s Hindi-language films
Indian romantic drama films
Indian romantic action films
1990s romantic musical films
1990s action films
Law enforcement in fiction
Films directed by Harry Baweja
Films set in psychiatric hospitals